The 2019 Tormenta FC season is the club's fourth season of existence, and their first season as a professional club. It is their first season playing in the third tier of American soccer and their first season playing in USL League One.

Background 
In January 2018, Tormenta FC was announced as the first founding member of USL League One for 2019. The team had an undefeated regular season in 2018, clinching the USL League Two Deep South division championship.

Club

Roster

Team management 

  John Miglarese – VP of Player Development and Head Coach
  Jorge Gonzalez – Assistant Coach
  John Kot – Assistant Coach
  Mike Panter – VP of Soccer Operations
  Bryce Judy - Director of Gameday Operations
  Bernadette O'Donnell – Director of Communications and Public Relations
  Logan Gleaton – Director of Marketing and Fan Engagement
  James Griffith – Director of Ticket Sales and Sponsorships
  Zachary Delgard - Director of Cooperate Partnerships
  Logan Crosby - Director of Business Development
  Corey Stone - Assistant Director of Franchise Development
  Hope Mullett - Assistant Director of Franchise Development

Non-competitive

Winter friendlies

Summer friendlies

Competitive

USL League One

Standings

Results by round

Match reports

U.S. Open Cup

Transfers

In

Statistics

Appearances and goals

|}

Disciplinary record

References

External links 

Tormenta FC seasons
Tormenta
Tormenta
Tormenta